PyMOL is an open source but proprietary molecular visualization system created by Warren Lyford DeLano. It was commercialized initially by DeLano Scientific LLC, which was a private software company dedicated to creating useful tools that become universally accessible to scientific and educational communities. It is currently commercialized by Schrödinger, Inc. As the original software license was a permissive licence, they were able to remove it; new versions are no longer released under the Python license, but under a custom license (granting broad use, redistribution, and modification rights, but assigning copyright to any version to Schrodinger, LLC.), and some of the source code is no longer released. PyMOL can produce high-quality 3D images of small molecules and biological macromolecules, such as proteins. According to the original author, by 2009, almost a quarter of all published images of 3D protein structures in the scientific literature were made using PyMOL.

PyMOL is one of the few mostly open-source model visualization tools available for use in structural biology. The Py part of the software's name refers to the program having been written in the programming language Python.

PyMOL uses OpenGL Extension Wrangler Library (GLEW) and FreeGLUT, and can solve Poisson–Boltzmann equations using the Adaptive Poisson Boltzmann Solver. PyMOL used Tk for the GUI widgets and had native Aqua binaries for macOS through Schrödinger, which were replaced with a PyQt user interface on all platforms with the release of version 2.0.

History and commercialization 
Early versions of PyMol were released under the Python License. On 1 August 2006, DeLano Scientific adopted a controlled-access download system for precompiled PyMOL builds (including betas) distributed by the company. Access to these executables is now limited to registered users who are paying customers; educational builds are available free to students and teachers. However, most of the current source code continues to be available for free, as are older precompiled builds. While the build systems for other platforms are open, the Windows API (WinAPI, Win32) build system is not, although unofficial Windows binaries are available online. Anyone can either compile an executable from the Python-licensed source code or pay for a subscription to support services to obtain access to precompiled executables.

On 8 January 2010, Schrödinger, Inc. reached an agreement to acquire PyMOL. The firm assumed development, maintenance, support, and sales of PyMOL, including all then-valid subscriptions. They also continue to actively support the PyMOL open-source community. In 2017, Schrödinger revamped the distribution system to unify the user interface under Qt and the package management under Anaconda, and released it as PyMol v2. This version restricts some new functionalities and adds a watermark to the visualization if used unlicensed beyond the 30-day trial period; the overall license policy is similar to the DeLano system. The source code remains mostly available, this time under a BSD-like license. As with the previous distribution, unofficial Windows binaries in the wheel format are available, and indeed Linux distributions continue to provide their own builds of the open-source code.

Element colors
PyMOL applies ball-coloring by element.

Gallery

See also

 Comparison of software for molecular mechanics modeling
 List of molecular graphics systems
 Molecular modelling
 Abalone
 Gabedit
 Molden
 Molekel
 RasMol
 SAMSON
 UCSF Chimera
List of free and open-source software packages

References

External links

 
PyMOL Wiki
Read-only PyMOL Wiki Mirror
Schrödinger LLC
 Molecular movie-making with PyMOL

Color codes
Articles containing video clips
Chemistry software for Linux
Free chemistry software
Molecular modelling software
Software that uses Tk (software)
Open-source software converted to a proprietary license